The 1979 Illinois Fighting Illini football team was an American football team that represented the University of Illinois during the 1979 Big Ten Conference football season. In their third year under head coach Gary Moeller, the Illini compiled a 2–8–1 record and finished in ninth place in the Big Ten Conference.

The team's offensive leaders were quarterback Lawrence McCullough with 1,254 passing yards, running back Mike Holmes with 792 rushing yards, and wide receiver John Lopez with 296 receiving yards. McCullough was selected as the team's most valuable player.

Schedule

Roster

References

Illinois
Illinois Fighting Illini football seasons
Illinois Fighting Illini football